Yeşilyurt is a village in the Ayvacık District of Çanakkale Province in Turkey. Its population is 166 (2021). Yeşilyurt Village Mosque is located in this village.

References

Villages in Ayvacık District, Çanakkale